Aaron Copeland may refer to:

 Aaron Copland (1900–1990), American composer, composition teacher, writer, and conductor
 Aaron Copeland (Home and Away), a fictional character in the TV series